XHACB-FM is a radio station on 98.9 FM in Ciudad Delicias, Chihuahua. The station is owned by Radiza and known as La Lupe with a grupera format.

History
XHACB began as XEACB-AM 660. It was owned by Roberto Díaz García, founder of Radiza, and signed on September 12, 1977.

It migrated to FM in 2011.

References

Radio stations in Chihuahua